Rhinogobius is a genus of primarily freshwater gobies native to tropical and temperate parts of eastern Asia. Most are small, streamlined in shape, and often sexually dimorphic. Few are of commercial importance, but R. duospilus is fairly widely traded as an aquarium fish.

Species

These are the currently recognized species in this genus:
 Rhinogobius albimaculatus I. S. Chen, Kottelat & P. J. Miller, 1999
 Rhinogobius aporus (J. S. Zhong & H. L. Wu, 1998)
 Rhinogobius biwaensis Takahashi & Okazaki, 2017
 Rhinogobius boa I. S. Chen & Kottelat, 2005
 Rhinogobius brunneus (Temminck & Schlegel, 1845) (Amur goby)
 Rhinogobius candidianus (Regan, 1908)
 Rhinogobius carpenteri Seale, 1910
 Rhinogobius changjiangensis I. S. Chen, P. J. Miller, H. L. Wu & L. S. Fang, 2002
 Rhinogobius changtinensis S. P. Huang & I. S. Chen, 2007
 Rhinogobius cheni (Nichols, 1931)
 Rhinogobius chiengmaiensis Fowler, 1934 (Chiangmai stream goby)
 Rhinogobius cliffordpopei (Nichols, 1925)
 Rhinogobius davidi (Sauvage & Dabry de Thiersant, 1874)
 Rhinogobius delicatus I. S. Chen & K. T. Shao, 1996
 Rhinogobius duospilus (Herre, 1935)
 Rhinogobius filamentosus (H. W. Wu, 1939)
 Rhinogobius flavoventris Herre, 1927
 Rhinogobius flumineus (Mizuno, 1960)
 Rhinogobius genanematus J. S. Zhong & C. S. Tzeng, 1998
 Rhinogobius gigas Aonuma & I. S. Chen, 1996
 Rhinogobius henchuenensis I. S. Chen & K. T. Shao, 1996
 Rhinogobius henryi (Herre, 1938)
 Rhinogobius honghensis I. S. Chen, J. X. Yang & Y. R. Chen, 1999
 Rhinogobius imfasciocaudatus V. H. Nguyễn & V. B. Vo, 2005
 Rhinogobius kurodai (Tanaka, 1908)
 Rhinogobius lanyuensis I. S. Chen, P. J. Miller & L. S. Fang, 1998
 Rhinogobius leavelli (Herre, 1935)
 Rhinogobius lentiginis (H. L. Wu & M. L. Zheng, 1985)
 Rhinogobius lindbergi L. S. Berg, 1933
 Rhinogobius lineatus I. S. Chen, Kottelat & P. J. Miller, 1999
 Rhinogobius linshuiensis I. S. Chen, P. J. Miller, H. L. Wu & L. S. Fang, 2002
 Rhinogobius longipinnis V. H. Nguyễn & V. B. Vo, 2005
 Rhinogobius longyanensis I. S. Chen, Y. H. Cheng & K. T. Shao, 2008
 Rhinogobius lungwoensis S. P. Huang & I. S. Chen, 2007 
 Rhinogobius maculafasciatus I. S. Chen & K. T. Shao, 1996
Rhinogobius maculagenys Q. Wu et al. 2018
 Rhinogobius maculicervix I. S. Chen & Kottelat, 2000
 Rhinogobius maxillivirgatus Xia, Wu & Li 2018
 Rhinogobius mekongianus (Pellegrin & P. W. Fang, 1940)
 Rhinogobius milleri I. S. Chen & Kottelat, 2001
 Rhinogobius mizunoi T. Suzuki, K. Shibukawa & M. Aizawa, 2017
 Rhinogobius multimaculatus (H. L. Wu & M. L. Zheng, 1985)
 Rhinogobius nagoyae D. S. Jordan & Seale, 1906
 R. n. formosanus Ōshima, 1919
 R. n. nagoyae D. S. Jordan & Seale, 1906
 Rhinogobius nammaensis I. S. Chen & Kottelat, 2001
 Rhinogobius nandujiangensis I. S. Chen, P. J. Miller, H. L. Wu & L. S. Fang, 2002
 Rhinogobius nantaiensis Aonuma & I. S. Chen, 1996
 Rhinogobius niger S. P. Huang, I. S. Chen & K. T. Shao, 2016 
 Rhinogobius ogasawaraensis T. Suzuki, I. S. Chen & Senou, 2011 
 Rhinogobius parvus (W. Y. Luo, 1989)
 Rhinogobius perpusillus Seale, 1910
 Rhinogobius ponkouensis S. P. Huang & I. S. Chen, 2007
 Rhinogobius reticulatus F. Li, J. S. Zhong & H. L. Wu, 2007
 Rhinogobius rubrolineatus I. S. Chen & P. J. Miller, 2008
 Rhinogobius rubromaculatus S. C. Lee & J. T. Chang, 1996
 Rhinogobius sagittus I. S. Chen & P. J. Miller, 2008
 Rhinogobius sangenloensis I. S. Chen & P. J. Miller, 2013 
 Rhinogobius similis T. N. Gill, 1859 
 Rhinogobius sowerbyi Ginsburg, 1917 
 Rhinogobius sulcatus I. S. Chen & Kottelat, 2005
 Rhinogobius szechuanensis (T. L. Tchang, 1939) 
 Rhinogobius taenigena I. S. Chen, Kottelat & P. J. Miller, 1999
 Rhinogobius telma (Suzuki, Kimura & Shibukawa, 2019)
 Rhinogobius tyoni (Suzuki, Kimura & Shibukawa, 2019)
 Rhinogobius variolatus I. S. Chen & Kottelat, 2005
 Rhinogobius vermiculatus I. S. Chen & Kottelat, 2001
 Rhinogobius virgigena I. S. Chen & Kottelat, 2005
 Rhinogobius wangchuangensis I. S. Chen, P. J. Miller, H. L. Wu & L. S. Fang, 2002
 Rhinogobius wangi I. S. Chen & L. S. Fang, 2006
 Rhinogobius wuyanlingensis J. Q. Yang, H. L. Wu & I. S. Chen, 2008
 Rhinogobius wuyiensis F. Li & J. S. Zhong, 2007
 Rhinogobius xianshuiensis I. S. Chen, H. L. Wu & K. T. Shao, 1999
 Rhinogobius yaima (Suzuki, Oseko, Kimura & Shibukawa, 2020)
 Rhinogobius yaoshanensis (W. Y. Luo, 1989)
 Rhinogobius yonezawai (Suzuki, Oseko, Kimura & Shibukawa, 2020)
 Rhinogobius zhoui F. Li & J. S. Zhong, 2009

In addition, there are four undescribed species in Japan awaiting further study:
 Rhinogobius sp. 'BB' "Blue Belly" Aobara-yoshinobori (Japanese)
 Rhinogobius sp. 'OM' Oumi-yoshinobori (Japanese)
 Rhinogobius sp. 'MO' "Mosaic" Aya-yoshinobori (Japanese)
 Rhinogobius sp. 'YB' "Yellow Belly" – Kibara-yoshinobori (Japanese)

References

 
Gobionellinae
Fish of Asia